Lujiabang Road is the name of an interchange station between Lines 8 and 9 on the Shanghai Metro network. It began operation on 29 December 2007 with the opening of line 8. It became an interchange station on 31 December 2009 with the opening of line 9.

The station is located in Huangpu District, Shanghai.

Station Layout 

Railway stations in Shanghai
Shanghai Metro stations in Huangpu District
Railway stations in China opened in 2007
Line 8, Shanghai Metro
Line 9, Shanghai Metro